Mark Abrahams (born 1958) is an American fashion and portrait photographer. His work has been featured in Bazaar, Glamour, GQ, The New York Times Magazine, V, Vanity Fair, and Vogue. His iconic portraits are known for featuring high-profile celebrities in raw, black and white detail.

Early life 
Abrahams was born in Santa Ana, California, and discovered photography after being given a Nikon FM camera. As a young man in the 1980s, Abrahams worked as a truck driver by day, while at night he turned his bathroom into a functioning darkroom to develop film and retouch negatives. By the early 1990s Abrahams began photographing musicians and supermodels, and his editorial shoots have been featured in international editions of Vogue, GQ, and other publications.

Career

Portraits and Editorial 
Abrahams' work has been founded over 30+ years and has been featured in Harper's Bazaar, Glamour, GQ, Vanity Fair, Interview Magazine, and more. These works often portray celebrity faces and bodies in true human form as people rather than celebrities. Editorial shots by Abrahams exemplify this arc of human nature, fusing the image of celebrity and raw humanity.  The photographer explains, “The intent of it is to strip away all the norms and expectations and get to the heart of the matter."  Abrahams has photographed many Hollywood and music industry icons, such as Julianne Moore, George Clooney, James Franco, Kate Winslet, Justin Timberlake, Tom Hanks, Sean Diddy Combs, and Dennis Hopper, as well as figures from politics, arts, and sports, such as Michelle Obama, Ed Ruscha, and Evander Holyfield. Among his works, Abrahams has photographed Sharon Stone and Allison Williams for Harper's Bazaar in 2015, has multiple covers for Vogue, and has over 630 editorial pieces featured in over 10 high-end fashion magazines and journals. "His subjects are not just famous, but often 'important.'" Annie Lebovitz explained about Abrahams, "Mark’s portraits are very clear & simple. It makes celebrities into people. I see the people. The portraits are direct."

Advertising 
Abrahams work has been featured in advertisement campaigns including:
 L'Oreal featuring Susan Sarandon
 Avon
 Neiman Marcus
 Converse
 Warner Brother's Pictures
 Barclay's Bank
 Omega

Exhibitions and Publications

"Two Colors" 
Abrahams' work has been featured at international art exhibits including the Jaguar Summer Museum in Moscow called "Two Colors".

Mark Abrahams 
In 2011, Abrahams released a book of candid black-and-white portraits featuring celebrities and personal photos titled Mark Abrahams. Annie Lebovitz hosted Abrahams' self-titled book launch. "Annie said that when she looks at [his] images, she sees the person and not the celebrity." Lebovitz urged Abrahams to publish the book and threw a party to congratulate him.

Personal life

Family 
Abrahams is notoriously private and shares his personal life with his family. He is married to designer Alexis Abrahams. The couple have one daughter together, Grace Bixby Abrahams.

Home Investments 
In 2015, the Abrahams sold their self-renovated townhouse at 58 Bank Street in the West Village for $18.1 million after purchasing it originally in 2005 for $3.75 million.

Charity 
Abrahams has had charitable projects with FINCA, Hope for Haiti Now, and MSK Cancer Research.

Social media 
Though private, Abrahams created an Instagram account in 2016, Facebook page, and personal website.

Net worth 
Abrahams' net worth is currently under review while he continues to make numerous investments

References

1958 births
Living people
People from Greenwich Village
20th-century American photographers
21st-century American photographers
American portrait photographers
Fashion photographers